Pseudocapillaria is a genus of nematodes belonging to the family Capillariidae.

The genus has almost cosmopolitan distribution.

Species:

Pseudocapillaria adriatica 
Pseudocapillaria bainae 
Pseudocapillaria bumpi 
Pseudocapillaria carangi 
Pseudocapillaria corvorum 
Pseudocapillaria decapteri 
Pseudocapillaria echenei 
Pseudocapillaria gibsoni 
Pseudocapillaria indica 
Pseudocapillaria lepidocephali 
Pseudocapillaria magalhaesi 
Pseudocapillaria margolisi 
Pseudocapillaria maricaensis 
Pseudocapillaria mergi 
Pseudocapillaria microspicula 
Pseudocapillaria novaecaledoniensis 
Pseudocapillaria ophisterni
Pseudocapillaria petit 
Pseudocapillaria salvelini 
Pseudocapillaria tomentosa 
Pseudocapillaria tomentosa 
Pseudocapillaria yucatanensis

References

Nematodes